Margie is a 1946 American romantic comedy film directed by Henry King and starring Jeanne Crain, about a high school girl in the 1920s who develops a crush on her French teacher. Margie was a box-office hit, ranking in the top 15 highest-grossing films of the year, and established Crain as an important Fox star. Although not a true movie musical (as it uses period recordings, with only one song being partially performed by a character in the film), it is sometimes classified with musicals due to the large number of 1920s-era popular songs incorporated as nostalgic background in the film.

The film was the basis for the 1961 television sitcom Margie, featuring Cynthia Pepper.

Plot
In 1946, Margie (Jeanne Crain) is a housewife reminiscing about her high school days with her own teenage daughter, who has just discovered her mother's old photo album in the attic. In a flashback to the 1920s, Margie is a high-spirited girl living with her dominant but good-hearted Grandmother McSweeney (Esther Dale). Her mother has died and her father (Hobart Cavanaugh), the local mortician, lives apart from Margie and her grandmother, only visiting on Wednesday due to his busy work schedule, and sometimes not even staying long enough to see his daughter. The youngest girl in her class, Margie does very well at her schoolwork, but she is not socially adept and wears old-fashioned clothing, including bloomers that frequently fall down. By contrast, her pretty and fashionable neighbor Marybelle Tenor (Barbara Lawrence) wears short skirts and lipstick and dates the popular but dimwitted captain of the football team, Johnny Green (Conrad Janis). Margie secretly has a crush on Johnny, but he regards her as a "pain in the neck". When Margie meets the handsome new French teacher at her high school, Professor Ralph Fontayne (Glenn Langan), she becomes even more smitten with him, and he seems to take an interest in her as well. Meanwhile, Margie's bumbling classmate Roy Hornsdale (Alan Young) is in love with her, and constantly attempts to court her despite her disinterest in him.

Margie participates in a school debate and is excited that both her father and Mr. Fontayne attend. Margie's father is impressed with her debating skills and proud of her. Afterwards, at the skating rink, Margie gets a chance to skate with Johnny but while they are skating, her bloomers fall down. Mr. Fontayne, who is looking on, saves her from public embarrassment by hiding them and tactfully returning them to her later.

When the big senior dance approaches, Margie plans to attend with Roy, but at the last minute Roy catches a cold and is forced to cancel, leaving Margie without an escort. Margie is too embarrassed to go alone or tell Marybelle, who is going with Johnny, that she doesn't have a date, and instead gives Marybelle the impression that Mr. Fontayne is taking her to the dance. Margie's grandmother meanwhile secretly arranges for her father to cancel a business meeting and take his daughter to the dance, but tells Margie only that a man "much older than 15" called to take her to the dance and withholds the man's identity to surprise Margie. When Mr. Fontayne comes to the house with a corsage, Margie thinks he is her date and is thrilled that her fantasy came true, until she sees by the florist's card that the corsage was intended for Mr. Fontayne's actual date, the school librarian Miss Palmer (Lynn Bari). Mr. Fontayne only stopped by to drop off Margie's French composition and compliment her on her good work, although he privately confesses to her grandmother that he would rather be taking Margie to the dance instead of Miss Palmer. Margie is at first devastated, but when her actual surprise date — her father — arrives to escort her to the dance, she is happy again. At the dance, Mr. Fontayne dances with Margie and tells her he would rather dance with her than anyone else, and she even attracts the attention of Johnny. Returning to the 1940s, it turns out Margie married Mr. Fontayne, who is now the principal at the same high school.

Cast
 Jeanne Crain as Marjorie 'Margie' MacDuff (singing voice was dubbed by Louanne Hogan)
 Glenn Langan as Professor Ralph Fontayne
 Lynn Bari as Miss Isabel Palmer
 Alan Young as Roy Hornsdale
 Barbara Lawrence as Marybelle Tenor
 Conrad Janis as Johnny 'Johnikins' Green
 Esther Dale as Grandma McSweeney
 Hobart Cavanaugh as Mr. Angus MacDuff
 Ann E. Todd as Joyce, Margie's teenage daughter
 Hattie McDaniel as Cynthia
Diana Herbert as Senior

The film marked the screen debut of Alan Young, who later appeared as "Wilbur Post" on the 1960s television series Mr. Ed.

Production
In January 1945, 20th Century Fox paid $12,500 for a story written by Ruth McKenney and her husband Richard Bransten. For the screenplay adaption, F. Hugh Herbert used elements from the film Girls' Dormitory (1936).

The male lead was initially offered to Cornel Wilde, but he refused it and was put on suspension by the studio. Next, Richard Jaeckel was announced as the male lead, but he was eventually replaced by Glenn Langan.

Set decorations include the 1794 Thomas Lawrence painting, Pinkie, which can be seen in the home of Margie and her grandmother, located on the wall in the sitting room.

The film was shot in Reno, Nevada. The exteriors of "Central High" are actually the University of Nevada, Reno. In some shots, the snow-covered Sierras can be seen. This film is considered an excellent example of the Technicolor film process.

A number of popular songs from the 1920s are used in the film, including "Margie", "At Sundown", "My Time Is Your Time" (sung by Rudy Vallée), "A Cup of Coffee, a Sandwich and You", "I'll See You In My Dreams", "Three O'Clock in the Morning", "April Showers", "The Charleston", "Wonderful One", and "Ain't She Sweet".

References

External links
 
 
 

1946 films
20th Century Fox films
Films adapted into television shows
Films directed by Henry King
Films scored by Alfred Newman
Films set in the 1920s
Films set in the 1940s
American romantic comedy films
1946 romantic comedy films
1940s American films